"Shout It Out Loud" may refer to:

 "Shout It Out Loud" (Kiss song)
 "Shout It Out Loud" (Robin S & DJ Escape song)

See also
 Shout It Out (disambiguation)
 Shout (disambiguation)